Al-Madina  is a Spanish 2010 documentary film.

Synopsis 
He traveled to another land, another sea, certain that he would find a better city, he was not aware that his city traveled with him. He sought other beings in this new city, but he found the same outskirt neighborhoods in which he was born. The poem by Constantine Kavafis, "The City", serves as the backdrop to the downhearted return of a Moroccan immigrant who lived in Spain from 2001 to 2010.

External links

2010 films
Spanish short documentary films
2010 short documentary films
Documentary films about immigration
2010s Spanish films